Broadlands is a village in Champaign County, Illinois, along the East Branch of the Embarras River. The population was 316 at the 2020 census. Broadlands was sold to John T. Alexander in 1866, and it was broken up upon his death in 1876 to pay his creditors.

Geography
Broadlands is located at  (39.908550, -87.995458).

Demographics

As of the 2020 census there were 316 people, 122 households, and 88 families residing in the village. The racial makeup of the village was 93.67% White, 0.95% African American, 0.95% from other races, and 4.43% from two or more races. Hispanic or Latino of any race were 2.53% of the population.

There were 122 households, out of which 43.44% had children under the age of 18 living with them, 67.21% were married couples living together, 3.28% had a female householder with no husband present, and 27.87% were non-families. 19.67% of all households were made up of individuals, and 11.48% had someone living alone who was 65 years of age or older. The average household size was 3.32 and the average family size was 2.79.

The village's age distribution consisted of 22.9% under the age of 18, 9.7% from 18 to 24, 22.3% from 25 to 44, 27.9% from 45 to 64, and 17.1% who were 65 years of age or older. The median age was 40.0 years. For every 100 females, there were 94.3 males. For every 100 females age 18 and over, there were 89.9 males.

The median income for a household in the village was $53,500, and the median income for a family was $76,875. Males had a median income of $45,417 versus $21,500 for females. The per capita income for the village was $22,762. About 20.5% of families and 20.9% of the population were below the poverty line, including 11.5% of those under age 18 and 25.9% of those age 65 or over.

Community 
The Village has a restaurant (Lincoln Street Lounge), an insurance agency (Loman-Ray Insurance), a post office, and a lawn care business (BA Lawncare). The Broadlands Fire Department has a station with an upgraded classroom and space for newer vehicles. Additional amenities available to all residents include a choice of three high-speed internet providers and water piped from the Mahomet Aquifer, as compared to the treated well water provided by most other nearby villages.

Elementary and junior high students from Broadlands attend school in Homer, while students in all of Heritage Community School District #8 (Homer, Allerton, Broadlands, Longview) attend the expanded high school in Broadlands.

The Broadlands Community Club holds a homecoming festival each year. The Club typically has events throughout the day for children and adults including a parade, afternoon entertainment, a fish fry and homemade pies.

The Village Board meets monthly, on the first Thursday, at 7 p.m. at Village Hall, 110 S. Lincoln St.

References

External links
 The New York Times, October 12, 1866
 The New York Times, August 26, 1866
 The New York Times, October 2, 1869

Villages in Champaign County, Illinois
Villages in Illinois
Populated places established in 1876
1876 establishments in Illinois